John Dawes (1940–2021) was a Welsh rugby union footballer.

John Dawes may also refer to:

Sir John Dawes, 1st Baronet (1644–1671), of the Dawes baronets
Johnny Dawes (born 1964), British rock climber

See also
John Dawe (1928–2013), Australian sailor
Dawes (surname)